Nazlu District is in Urmia County, West Azerbaijan province, Iran. At the 2006 National Census, its population was 36,732 in 8,943 households. The following census in 2011 counted 39,495 people in 10,115 households. At the latest census in 2016, the district had 39,701 inhabitants in 10,683 households.

References 

Urmia County

Districts of West Azerbaijan Province

Populated places in West Azerbaijan Province

Populated places in Urmia County